"Izlel ye Delyo Haydutin" is a Bulgarian folk song from the central Rhodope Mountains about Delyo, a rebel leader who was active in the late seventeenth and early eighteenth centuries. The song is most famously sung by Valya Balkanska, a 1977 recording of which was included on the Golden Record carried on board the Voyager 1 and Voyager 2 probes.

Other versions
The first versions of the song were recorded by Georgi Chilingirov and Nadezhda Hvoyneva. Recordings of Valya Balkanska singing it were first made by the American scholar of Bulgarian folklore Martin Koenig in the late 1960s, along with other original Bulgarian folk songs. 

An instrumental arrangement appears on Wendy Carlos' album Beauty in the Beast as "A Woman's Song," with synthesized Indian and Western instrumentation in place of Bulgarian bagpipes.

Lyrics

Sources

Bulgarian folk songs
Contents of the Voyager Golden Record
Songs about military officers
Cultural depictions of military officers
Cultural depictions of Bulgarian men